NGC 27 is a spiral galaxy located in the constellation Andromeda. It was discovered on 3 August 1884 by Lewis Swift. It forms a galaxy pair with the nearby UGC 95.

See also 
 Spiral galaxy 
 List of largest galaxies
 List of nearest galaxies
 List of NGC objects (1–1000)
 Andromeda (constellation)

References

External links 
 
 
 SEDS

Galaxies discovered in 1884
0027
742
Andromeda (constellation)
Spiral galaxies
18840803
Discoveries by Lewis Swift